Spectral Sciences Incorporated (SSI) is a research and development company, located in Burlington, Massachusetts, United States.

Spectral Sciences was founded in 1981. Its primary focus is the development of concepts and prototype scientific software and instrumentation. Clients include the US Government as well as industry.

Areas of expertise include electro-optic remote sensing, atmospheric radiation transport, the science of combustion, computational physics, chemistry and molecular dynamics, energy management, 3-D and spectral scene modeling, spectroscopy, UV through IR optical signature analysis, tomography methods and analysis and electro-optical instrumentation development in support of phenomenological studies and new measurement concepts.

Software developed by SSI and available to the public include:

 FLAASH and QUAC, atmospheric correction codes which calculate spectrally resolved ground reflectance from hyperspectral imaging and multispectral imaging.  Both codes are available as the Atmospheric Correction Module plug-in for ENVI.

 MODTRAN radiative transfer code.

References

External links
Spectral Sciences, Inc. web site

Technology companies of the United States